Brahima Ouattara (born 23 November 2002) is an Ivorian professional footballer who plays as a midfielder for Swiss Challenge League club Neuchâtel Xamax.

Club career
Ouattara began his career with RC Abidjan in Ivory Coast. In January 2021, he signed for Nice in France before joining Lausanne-Sport on loan for the 2020–21 season. He made his professional debut with the club in a 1–0 Swiss Super League loss to Young Boys on 10 February 2021. At the end of the season, Lausanne-Sport extended the loan.

On 24 August 2022, Ouattara signed with Neuchâtel Xamax.

International career
Ouattara represented the Ivory Coast U20s for 2021 Africa U-20 Cup of Nations qualification matches, where he scored 2 goals in 4 games.

References

External links
 
 SFL Profile
 Ligue 1 Profile

2002 births
Living people
People from Bouaké
Ivorian footballers
Ivory Coast under-20 international footballers
OGC Nice players
FC Lausanne-Sport players
Neuchâtel Xamax FCS players
Ligue 1 (Ivory Coast) players
Swiss Super League players
Swiss Challenge League players
Association football midfielders
Ivorian expatriate footballers
Ivorian expatriate sportspeople in Switzerland
Expatriate footballers in Switzerland
Ivorian expatriate sportspeople in France
Expatriate footballers in France